Novotroyevka is a rural locality (a village) in Nordovsky Selsoviet, Meleuzovsky District, Bashkortostan, Russia. The population was 6 as of 2010. There is 1 street.

Geography 
Novotroyevka is located 50 km northwest of Meleuz (the district's administrative centre) by road. Varvarino is the nearest rural locality.

References 

Rural localities in Meleuzovsky District